Bossey is a commune in the Haute-Savoie department in the Auvergne-Rhône-Alpes region in Eastern France. Located on the Swiss border, it had a population of 1,031 as of 2018.

Personalities
Bossey is the birthplace of poet Jean-Vincent Verdonnet (1923–2013). Philosopher and political theorist Jean-Jacques Rousseau (1712–1778) lived in the village between 1722 and 1724.

See also
Communes of the Haute-Savoie department

References

Communes of Haute-Savoie